Killian Colombie (born 2 November 1995) is a French professional footballer who plays as a forward for Fjölnir in the Icelandic second tier.

Career

Youth and college
Colombie enrolled at Iona College in 2015 and joined the Iona Gaels men's soccer team. Once the Iona season began, Colombie started in all 18 games he appeared in. Across four seasons with Iona, Colombie played in 72 games and tallied 15 goals and six assists as a forward. The Paris, France native set career-best marks in his senior season with the Maroon & Gold, scoring seven goals and assisting on three more. His performance in his senior season garnered him recognition on the All-MAAC First Team as well as second team honors on the United Soccer Coaches NCAA Division I All-East Region Team.

Colombie finished his Iona career ranked tied for ninth all-time in shots attempted (119) and shots on goal (48). He ended his career with 15 goals, six assists and three game-winning goals. Colombie's efforts placed him among 50 student-athletes on the initial PDL College Prospect List. Additionally, Colombie was eligible for the MLS Super Draft 2019 in Chicago.

In 2018, Colombie had most recently been on trial with Hearts F.C. in Edinburgh, Scotland. He has also received invitation from the New York Red Bulls. In addition to securing a training spot with Edinburgh, Colombie has trained with the Major League Soccer programs, the New York Red Bulls and San Jose Earthquakes, during the winter.

Senior
Over the summer before the fall 2018 season, Colombie played for the Albion Hurricanes FC Royals in the Premier Developmental League Mid-South Division. He led the team and tied for the conference-best with 10 goals. His five assists were a team-best and ranked second in the league. The Royals finished the season with a third place 7–7–0 record and a goal differential of zero.

Iona College men's soccer alumnus Killian Colombie signed with the Swope Park Rangers of the United Soccer League in February 2019. The Rangers are affiliated with Sporting Kansas City of Major League Soccer.

In September 2020, he joined National League side Aldershot Town, before moving to Lewes ahead of the 2021-22 season.

References

External links
Profile at Iona College

1995 births
Living people
Association football forwards
French footballers
Paris Saint-Germain F.C. players
Iona Gaels men's soccer players
Brazos Valley Cavalry FC players
Sporting Kansas City II players
Aldershot Town F.C. players
Ungmennafélagið Fjölnir players
USL League Two players
USL Championship players
National League (English football) players
1. deild karla players
French expatriate footballers
Expatriate soccer players in the United States
French expatriate sportspeople in the United States
Expatriate footballers in England
French expatriate sportspeople in England
Expatriate footballers in Iceland
French expatriate sportspeople in Iceland